Gillian Linscott (born 27 September 1944) is a British author. She studied at Somerville College, Oxford.

She worked as a journalist for the Liverpool Daily Post, Birmingham Post, The Guardian and BBC, before becoming a novelist, specialising in crime writing. Her novel Absent Friends won the 2000 British Crime Writers' Association prize The Ellis Peters Historical Dagger.

She is married to author Tony Geraghty and lives in Herefordshire.

Bibliography
A Healthy Body (1984)
Murder Makes Tracks (1985)
Knightfall (1986)
A Whiff Of Sulphur (1987)
Unknown Hand (1988)
Murder, I Presume (1990)
Sister Beneath the Sheet (1991)
Hanging on the Wire (1992)
Stage Fright (1993)
Widow's Peak (1994) (a.k.a. An Easy Day for a Lady)
Crown Witness (1995)
Dead Man's Music (1996) (a.k.a. Dead Man's Sweetheart)
Dance On Blood (1998)
Absent Friends (1999)
The Perfect Daughter (2000)
Dead Man Riding (2002)
The Garden (2003)
Blood On The Wood (2003)

Caro Peacock
Linscott writes the Liberty Lane detective/mystery series using the pen name Caro Peacock. 
 Death At Dawn (2007), in the USA as A Foreign Affair, and in Italy as Morte all'alba
 Death of a Dancer (2008), in the USA as A Dangerous Affair
 A Corpse in Shining Armour (2009), in the USA as A Family Affair
 When the Devil Drives (2011)
 Keeping Bad Company (2012)
 The Path of the Wicked (2013)
 Friends in High Places (2015)

Prizes
The Ellis Peters Historical Dagger, 2000, for Absent Friends
The Herodotus Award for the Best International Historical Mystery Novel (2000), for Absent Friends

References

External links
Author web site
FantasticFiction: Gillian Linscott
twobooks.co.uk: Gillian Linscott
New Statesman: "Dawn raids: A guide to the etiquette" by Gillian Linscott, 1998
New Statesman: "It can't happen here - can it?" by Gillian Linscott, 1999
The story behind Friends in High Places - Essay by Caro Peacock, 2015 

1944 births
Living people
British writers
People from Windsor, Berkshire
The Guardian journalists
People from Herefordshire
Women mystery writers
Alumni of Somerville College, Oxford